KFRM (550 AM) is a commercial radio station licensed to Salina, Kansas, United States. It is owned by Taylor Communications, Inc. KFRM has studios and offices in Clay Center. On weekdays, KFRM carries mostly news and agricultural information shows for farming communities. Nights and weekends it plays classic country music.

Due to its low position on the dial, KFRM enjoys a wide coverage area during the day. The transmitter is off U.S. Route 81 (140th Road) in Concordia.  KFRM is powered at 5,000 watts by day, using a directional antenna aimed toward the southeast. It puts a high quality signal over most of Central Kansas, including Wichita. A fair signal is delivered to Oklahoma City. However, it is hard to hear in Kansas City. To avoid interfering with other stations on AM 550, KFRM drops its power to 110 watts at night, when radio waves travel further. After sunset, the station's signal is restricted to communities in and around Salina.

History 

KFRM was founded by Arthur B. Church, a prominent broadcaster and the president of Midland Broadcasting company, operators of KMBC radio. He had founded Midland Broadcasting in 1927 and over the years built KMBC into a high-quality full service radio station.  KFRM maintained a fully staffed farm news department, complete with an 800-acre service farm, a multi-reporter local and regional news operation, home economics department, and comprehensive sports reporting.  The station staff, including 30 full-time musicians and vocalists, sometimes numbered up to 130.

The Federal Communications Commission issued a construction permit on August 19, 1946, for a 5,000-watt daytimer radio station with the transmitter located in Cloud County, Kansas.  The FCC permit was issued to Midland Broadcasting Company, which would plan to extend KMBC programming into central and western Kansas with a satellite station on 550 kc. broadcasting from North Central Kansas.  KMBC would plan to feed its programming audio over telephone lines 175 miles west to the KFRM transmitter site.

KFRM signed on the air on Sunday, December 7, 1947.  For the next fourteen years, the KMBC-KFRM team would bring high quality broadcasting to rural Kansas.  The programming would emanate from the KMBC studios, on the 10th and 11th floors of the Pickwick Hotel, at 10th and McGee streets in downtown Kansas City, Missouri.

In June 1954, KFRM was sold to Cook Paint & Varnish Company.  In January 1961, it was announced that KFRM would be sold to Norman E. Kightlinger and Associates, a furniture dealer and real estate and insurance agent.  His major partner was investor C.B. McNeil of Tulsa.  The sale to the new owners, KFRM, Inc., was approved by the FCC in August 1961.

In 1965, there would be both an ownership change, and a format change for KFRM.  There had been four partners in KFRM, Inc., but in September of that year, the FCC approved the sale of the station to C.B. McNeil himself, as he bought out the interests of the other partners.  At the time of the ownership change, it was announced that the format of the station would change to that of country music.  However, a tragic accident one week later would significantly affect the KFRM ownership and programming plans.  On October 7,  the 47-year-old McNeil would be killed in a crash of his light airplane near Tulsa, Oklahoma.

In May 1966, the executor of the McNeil estate filed an application with the FCC to sell the stock of KFRM, Inc. to JACO, Inc., whose major stockholders were M. Crawford Clark and James C. Treat.  They were executives at radio station KOOO in Omaha, Nebraska, which was owned by broadcaster John Bozeman, better known by his on-air stage name, Mack Sanders.

The following portion of this KFRM history was written by Jerry Venable, original manager of The Plainsmen.

The story goes that in the mid-'50s, Mack Sanders came to Wichita with less than $100 in his pocket and said: "I'm going to own me a radio station."  He was affiliated with KFDI for a while, and he had a successful TV show called " Mack."  In 1965, Sanders owned an AM station in Wichita, one in Omaha, and one in Lincoln.  He had a "silent partner" by the name of Port Early, a respected lawyer in Wichita.  He handled the legal business, while Sanders handled the broadcasting.

The take-over of KFRM came in approximately 1967.   Sanders kept it "close to the belt" for the first year or so.  He did have the Ranch Boys Band, which consisted of himself, his wife Jeannie, Wayne Pollard and Gene Morris.  He also had Lee Nichols and The Minshall Trio.  Jerry Minshall was news director, and Maxine Egbert became head of accounting.  Then he brought in The Plainsmen, who had recorded "North to " with Johnny Horton.  It was the title song to the John Wayne Movie by that name.  They had experienced some poor management and were almost in a bankrupt situation when he took them into his company.

In 1968, Sanders began to work with Roy Clark, who had been fired from the "Jimmy Dean Show" for tardiness.  He paid Roy an average of $300 per date in those days.  Then, Roy had a couple of hit songs, before joining "Hee Haw" in 1969.  By 1972, Roy was making $50,000.00 per night.

In time, Sanders made the entertainment part a separate corporation, "Mack Sanders Productions", owned by "The Plainsmen", with Jerry Venable as manager.

Entertainment always made the difference with KFRM.  Each new studio built had a full sized broadcast studio, and "The Ranch Boys", "The Plainsmen", Lee Nichols, Mack Sanders, and the whole gang did a live broadcast during the noon hour called the "Dinner Bell Jamboree."  The show lasted long after all others had ceased from this format, and it worked very well, both in revenues and audience.

Promotional shows were always a part of the picture.  In 1972, the annual "Singathon" was held in Hutchinson, Kansas.  Abram Burnett, who hosted "Gospel Down South" on Sunday mornings, served as host of the show, and it featured some of the outstanding groups on Gospel Music.  "The Statesmen", "The  Boys", "The Cathedrals", Jimmy Davis, etc.  It never had a bad turn-out.

The big KFRM Radio Road Show had some 23 people in it.  "The Ranch Boys Band", "The Plainsmen", "The Marshall Trio", Juanita Rose, Lee Nichols, among others.  Mack Sanders served as host.

Kansas agri-business broadcaster Larry Steckline, who would later become one of Kansas' most prominent and influential broadcasters, began his radio career with KFRM, for several years. In 1977, following an abrupt dismissal from KFRM (due to sale of the station), Steckline created his own "Mid America Ag Network" (Wichita, Kansas), a syndication of his "ag-news" shows state-wide, and beyond—and eventually acquired dozens of radio stations throughout Kansas.

In 1977, Mack Sanders purchased a radio station in Nashville, where he also owned a home. He announced that he had sold both KFRM and his Wichita FM station, KICT-FM, to Great Plains Radio, Inc., a subsidiary of the Peoria Journal-Star newspaper that also owned other radio properties.

In March 1985, the sale of KFRM was announced to the
general partner of Compass Communications, a California organization.  The sale was approved by the FCC in December 1985, and in that same month, Compass applied for the call letters of KNNN
to replace the nearly forty-year-old KFRM call sign.  Later, in 1986, Compass again changed call
letters, this time to KICT.

Compass then announced they were selling all their stations,
and KICT-AM 550 was sold in July 1987, to HRH Broadcasting Corp., Herb and
Ruby Hoeflicker, who immediately applied to the FCC to change the call letters
back to KFRM.  On Wednesday, October 21,
1987, KFRM 550 AM returned to the air.

Then next sale of KFRM came on February 15, 1991, when the FCC approved the sale from HRH Broadcasting Co to Great American Broadcasting,
Inc., of Kansas, headed by Mack and Sherry Sanders. Sanders had, of course, operated KFRM before, from 1967-1978.   Two years later, Sanders filed for bankruptcy protection for Great American, and on May 3, 1993, he sought to assign the KFRM license back to HRH Broadcasting.  Sanders died later that year at the age of 80.

In August 1996, HRH Broadcasting announced the sale of KFRM to Taylor Communications, Inc. of Clay Center, Kansas.   The studios and offices were moved to in September 1996, where Taylor Communications also operated KCLY-FM.  Kyle Bauer was named general manager of both stations.  Taylor Communications continues to operate KFRM today, making them the longest term owner of the station.

References

External links

 A History of Radio Station KFRM, by Charles Frodsham, February 16, 2015

FRM
Radio stations established in 1947
1947 establishments in Kansas
Full service radio stations in the United States